Prairietown is an unincorporated community in Cabell County, West Virginia, United States.  The name was supposed to be Perrytown, but was mis-labeled by cartographers.  Named because the area is home to scores of descendants of Rev. Benjamin Level Perry, born 12 Apr 1808 in Orange Co, Virginia; died 08 Jun 1897 near "Perrytown".

References 

Unincorporated communities in West Virginia
Unincorporated communities in Cabell County, West Virginia